Adam Małysz Ski Jumping Hill in Wisła-Malinka is a ski jumping hill in Wisła, Poland.

History
This venue hosts competitions of FIS Ski Jumping Continental Cup, FIS Ski Jumping Grand Prix and FIS Ski Jumping World Cup. Before the last renovation (2004-2008) this ski jump hosted only local events. Since 2010 the HS 134 in Wisła has been annual host of summer Grand Prix events. The first World Cup competition on Adam Małysz ski jump took place on January 9, 2013. Norway's Anders Bardal won the first place and Austria's Stefan Kraft set up a hill record of 139 meters during qualification.

Very special of the new built Malinka ski jumping hill is the road, which had to be barricade during training jumps on the old hill and no leading through a tunnel below the artificial hill in the outrun. Above this street is the main stand which will host 2,500 spectators and official buildings. The facilities are constructed out of stone, wood, glass, aluminium and natural concrete and shall be functional, innovative and nice.

Events

Men

External links
official at wisla-malinka.com

Ski jumping venues in Poland
Sports venues in Silesian Voivodeship